Cessnock can refer to:
Cessnock, Glasgow
Cessnock subway station, an underground station in Glasgow
Cessnock, New South Wales
 Electoral district of Cessnock, an electoral district in the New South Wales Legislative Assembly
 City of Cessnock, the local government area
 Cessnock Correctional Centre, a prison in the area
HMAS Cessnock, one of two Royal Australian Navy ships:
HMAS Cessnock (J175), a Bathurst class corvette
HMAS Cessnock (FCPB 210), a Fremantle class patrol boat